Charles Christian Broadbeck (3 October 1868 – 31 December 1944) was a Swiss gymnast. He competed in the men's individual all-around event at the 1900 Summer Olympics.

References

External links
 

1868 births
1944 deaths
Swiss male artistic gymnasts
Olympic gymnasts of Switzerland
Gymnasts at the 1900 Summer Olympics
People from Évian-les-Bains
Sportspeople from Haute-Savoie
Swiss people of French descent
Swiss people of British descent